The 1956 football season was São Paulo's 27th season since club's existence.

Overall

{|class="wikitable"
|-
|Games played ||  72 (36 Campeonato Paulista, 36 Friendly match)
|-
|Games won ||  45 (25 Campeonato Paulista, 20 Friendly match)
|-
|Games drawn ||  10 (5 Campeonato Paulista, 5 Friendly match)
|-
|Games lost ||  17 (6 Campeonato Paulista, 11 Friendly match)
|-
|Goals scored || 193
|-
|Goals conceded || 105
|-
|Goal difference || +88
|-
|Best result || 7–2 (H) v Noroeste – Campeonato Paulista – 1956.07.14
|-
|Worst result || 1–4 (A) v Santos – Friendly match – 1956.01.21
|-
|Most appearances || 
|-
|Top scorer || 
|-

Friendlies

Official competitions

Campeonato Paulista

Record

External links
official website 

Association football clubs 1956 season
1956
1956 in Brazilian football